Koljonselkä may refer to:

 Koljonselkä, a lake basin in lake Längelmävesi, Finland
 Koljonselkä, a lake basin in lake Näsijärvi, Finland